Gnaeus Cornelius Lentulus is the name of several ancient Romans, including:

 Gnaeus Cornelius Lentulus (consul 146 BC)
 Gnaeus Cornelius Lentulus (consul 97 BC), son of the above
 Gnaeus Cornelius Lentulus Clodianus, consul in 72 BC who was defeated by Spartacus
 Gnaeus Cornelius Lentulus Marcellinus, consul in 56 BC
 Gnaeus Cornelius Lentulus Augur, consul in 14 BC
 Gnaeus Cornelius Lentulus Gaetulicus (consul 26), consul in 26 AD
 Gnaeus Cornelius Lentulus Gaetulicus (consul 55)